Kofi Apea-Adu (born 3 March 1995) is a South African cricketer. He made his first-class debut for Easterns in the 2014–15 Sunfoil 3-Day Cup on 27 November 2014.

References

External links
 

1995 births
Living people
South African cricketers
Easterns cricketers
People from Polokwane
Sportspeople from Limpopo